Sergei Vladimirovich Polyakov (born January 22, 1968, in Vinnytsia) is a Russian sport shooter, specializing in the 25 metre rapid fire pistol event. He won the silver medal at the 2004 Olympic Games in the 25 metre rapid fire pistol event.

External links
Profile on issfnews.com

1968 births
Living people
Sportspeople from Vinnytsia
Russian male sport shooters
ISSF pistol shooters
Olympic shooters of Russia
Shooters at the 2004 Summer Olympics
Olympic silver medalists for Russia
Olympic medalists in shooting
Medalists at the 2004 Summer Olympics